Cameltoe may refer to:
Big poes
 Camel toe, the outline of a woman's genitalia
 Cameltoe, a 2003 single by FannyPack
 Camel Toe (album), a 2002 comedy album
 Camel, the widened toes on hoofs of camelids

See also
Cameltosis, a Tre Hardson track
Camel joe, a cartoon mascot
Mooseknuckle or manbulge, the male equivalent of the cameltoe